Yereymentau (Ereimentau) is a town in northern-central Kazakhstan. It is the seat of Yereymentau District in Akmola Region. Population:

References

Populated places in Akmola Region